A virtual private server (VPS) is a virtual machine sold as a service by an Internet hosting service. The virtual dedicated server (VDS) also has a similar meaning.

A virtual private server runs its own copy of an operating system (OS), and customers may have superuser-level access to that operating system instance, so they can install almost any software that runs on that OS. For many purposes it is functionally equivalent to a dedicated physical server and, being software-defined, can be created and configured more easily. A virtual server costs less than an equivalent physical server. However, as virtual servers share the underlying physical hardware with other VPSes, performance may be lower, depending on the workload of any other executing virtual machines.

Virtualization 
The force driving server virtualization is similar to that which led to the development of time-sharing and multiprogramming in the past. Although the resources are still shared, as under the time-sharing model, virtualization provides a higher level of security, dependent on the type of virtualization used, as the individual virtual servers are mostly isolated from each other and may run their own full-fledged operating system which can be independently rebooted as a virtual instance.

Partitioning a single server to appear as multiple servers has been increasingly common on microcomputers since the release of VMware ESX Server in 2001. The physical server typically runs a hypervisor which is tasked with creating, releasing, and managing the resources of "guest" operating systems, or virtual machines. These guest operating systems are allocated a share of resources of the physical server, typically in a manner in which the guest is not aware of any other physical resources except for those allocated to it by the hypervisor. As a VPS runs its own copy of its operating system, customers have superuser-level access to that operating system instance, and can install almost any software that runs on the OS; however, due to the number of virtualization clients typically running on a single machine, a VPS generally has limited processor time, RAM, and disk space.

Motivation 

VPSs may be used to decrease hardware costs by condensing a failover cluster to a single machine, thus decreasing costs whilst providing services. Server roles and features are generally designed to operate in isolation. For example, Windows Server 2019 requires a certificate authority and a domain controller to exist on independent servers with independent instances of Windows Server. This is because additional roles and features add areas of potential failure as well as adding security risks (placing a certificate authority on a domain controller poses the potential for root access to the root certificate). This motivates demand for virtual private servers in order to retain conflicting server roles and features on a single hosting machine. Also, virtual machine encrypted networks decrease pass-through risks that might have otherwise discouraged VPS usage as a hosting server.

A dedicated server will meet requirements, but costs more money. A VPS is meant to improve the performance of a website by sectioning it into its own zone, free of traffic from other websites. However, these elements may affect a site's ability to give visitors a trustworthy experience.

Hosting 
Many companies offer virtual private server hosting or virtual dedicated server hosting as an extension for web hosting services. There are several challenges to consider when licensing proprietary software in multi-tenant virtual environments.

With unmanaged or self-managed hosting, the customer is left to administer their own server instance.

Unmetered hosting is generally offered with no limit on the amount of data transferred on a fixed bandwidth line. Usually, unmetered hosting is offered with 10 Mbit/s, 100 Mbit/s, or 1000 Mbit/s (with some as high as 10 Gbit/s). This means that the customer is theoretically able to use approximately 3 TB on 10 Mbit/s or up to approximately 300 TB on a 1000 Mbit/s line per month; although in practice the values will be significantly less. In a virtual private server, this will be shared bandwidth and a fair usage policy should be involved. Unlimited hosting is also commonly marketed but generally limited by acceptable usage policies and terms of service. Offers of unlimited disk space and bandwidth are always false due to cost, carrier capacities, and technological boundaries.

See also 
 Comparison of platform virtualization software
 Cloud computing

References 

Servers (computing)

Cloud computing